This is the discography of British musician Ian Dury, including with Kilburn and the High Roads and the Blockheads.

Albums

Studio albums

Live albums

Compilation albums

Box sets

Video albums

EPs

Singles

See also
 The Blockheads discography

References

Discographies of British artists
Punk rock discographies
New wave discographies